Kleiton Barbosa de Oliveira Lima (born 5 May 1974), known as Kleiton Lima, is a Brazilian football manager, currently in charge of Santos' women's team.

Career
Born in Santos, São Paulo, Lima was a midfielder during his playing days. After finishing his graduation with Santos, he went on to represent Comercial de Ribeirão Preto and San Francisco All Blacks as a professional. In 1994, after playing for the latter, he went on to help Carlos Alberto Parreira's staff as a scout after playing a friendly against Russia, an opponent of Brazil during the year's FIFA World Cup.

In 1997 Lima returned to Santos, being appointed manager of the women's team. He was also in charge of the country for three years, winning four major titles and finishing fifth in 2011 FIFA Women's World Cup. After being dismissed by Peixe in late 2010, he also had a short spell at Vitória das Tabocas.

In December 2011 Lima moved to men's football, being an assistant of Sérgio Guedes at Red Bull Brasil. He remained as Guedes' second at São Caetano, Sport (two spells) and XV de Piracicaba.

On 28 February 2014 Lima was named manager of Grêmio Barueri. After failing to avoid relegation from Campeonato Paulista Série A2, he was sacked on 18 June.

In April 2015 Lima returned to his first club Santos, being appointed manager of the club's newly formed B-team. He was sacked in February 2018.

On 29 August 2022, Lima returned to Santos and their women's team, after being again named manager.

Honours
Santos
Copa do Brasil de Futebol Feminino: 2008, 2009
Campeonato Paulista de Futebol Feminino: 2007, 2010, 2011
International Women's Soccer Cup: 2004

Vitória-PE
Campeonato Pernambucano de Futebol Feminino: 2011

Brazil
South American Under-20 Women's Football Championship: 2008, 2010
Torneio Internacional de Futebol Feminino: 2009
Copa América Femenina: 2010

References

External links
Grande Área profile 

1974 births
Living people
Sportspeople from Santos, São Paulo
Brazilian football managers
Santos FC (women) managers
Brazil women's national football team managers
Grêmio Barueri Futebol managers
2011 FIFA Women's World Cup managers